Adrian Sandu (born 19 October 1966) is a Romanian gymnast. He competed at the 1988 Summer Olympics and the 1992 Summer Olympics.

References

1966 births
Living people
Romanian male artistic gymnasts
Olympic gymnasts of Romania
Gymnasts at the 1988 Summer Olympics
Gymnasts at the 1992 Summer Olympics
Sportspeople from Sibiu